A list of films produced by the Ollywood film industry based in Bhubaneswar in the 1930s:

References

1930s
Ollywood
Films, Ollywood